Fras may refer to:

People
 Adda Fras (fl.  1240), Welsh poet
 Damjan Fras (born 1973), Slovenian ski jumper
 Milan Fras, Slovenian singer, member of Laibach
 Slavko Fras (1928-2010), Slovenian journalist
 Théophile Fras (born 1873), French cyclist

Places
 Aïn Fras, Mascara Province, Algeria
 Foel-fras, Carneddau range, Wales
 Haig Fras, rocky outcrop in the Celtic Sea

See also
 Fra
 FRAS (disambiguation)
 Frass
 Fraas